Philip Phillips (died 1787) was an Irish clergyman of the Roman Catholic Church. He served as Archbishop of Tuam from 1785 to 1787.

He was appointed Bishop of Killala on 24 November 1760, and translated to the bishopric of Achonry on 22 November 1785. He translated again to the archbishopric of Tuam on 22 November 1785. He died in office in September 1787.

References

External links
A Bishop from the Parish

1787 deaths
Christian clergy from County Galway
Roman Catholic archbishops of Tuam
Roman Catholic bishops of Killala
Roman Catholic bishops of Achonry
Year of birth unknown
18th-century Roman Catholic archbishops in Ireland